The AP 42 Compilation of Air Pollutant Emission Factors is a compilation of the US Environmental Protection Agency (EPA)'s emission factor information on air pollution, first published in 1968. , the last edition is the 5th from 2010.

History
The AP 42 Compilation of Air Pollutant Emission Factors is a compilation of emission factors of air pollutants, in other words numbers which relate the quantity of a pollutant released into the ambient air with a certain activity. This compilation was first compiled and published by the US Public Health Service in 1968. In 1972, it was revised and issued as the second edition by the US Environmental Protection Agency EPA. 
In 1985, the subsequent fourth edition was split into two volumes: Volume I has since included stationary point and area source emission factors, and Volume II includes mobile source emission factors. Volume I is currently in its fifth edition and is available on the Internet. 
Volume II is no longer maintained as such, but roadway air dispersion models for estimating emissions from onroad vehicles and from non-road vehicles and mobile equipment are available on the Internet.

In routine common usage, Volume I of the emission factor compilation is very often referred to as simply AP 42.

Content
Air pollution emission factors are usually expressed as the weight of the pollutant divided by a unit weight, volume, distance, or duration of the activity emitting the pollutant (e.g., kilograms of particulate matter emitted per megagram of coal burned). The factors help to estimate emissions from various sources of air pollution. In most cases, the factors are simply averages of all available data of acceptable quality, and are generally assumed to be representative of long-term averages. 

The equation for the estimation of emissions before emission reduction controls are applied is:

E = A × EF

and for emissions after reduction controls are applied:

E = A × EF × (1-ER/100)

Emission factors are used by atmospheric dispersion modelers and others to determine the amount of air pollutants being emitted from sources within industrial facilities.

Chapters

Chapter 5, Section 5.1 "Petroleum Refining" discusses the air pollutant emissions from the equipment in the various refinery processing units as well as from the auxiliary steam-generating boilers, furnaces and engines, and Table 5.1.1 includes the pertinent emission factors. Table 5.1.2 includes the emission factors for the fugitive air pollutant emissions from the large wet cooling towers in refineries and from the oil/water separators used in treating refinery wastewater.

The fugitive air pollutant emission factors from relief valves, piping valves, open-ended piping lines or drains, piping flanges,  sample connections, and seals on pump and compressor shafts are discussed and included the report EPA-458/R-95-017, "Protocol for Equipment Leak Emission Estimates" which is included in the Chapter 5 section of AP 42. That report includes the emission factors developed by the EPA for petroleum refineries and for the synthetic organic chemical industry (SOCMI).

In most cases, the emission factors in Chapter 5 are included for both uncontrolled conditions before emission reduction controls are implemented and controlled conditions after specified emission reduction methods are implemented.

Chapter 7 "Liquid Storage Tanks" is devoted to the methodology for calculating the emissions losses from the six basic tank designs used for organic liquid storage: fixed roof (vertical and
horizontal), external floating roof, domed external (or covered) floating roof, internal floating roof, variable vapor space, and pressure (low and high). The methodology in Chapter 7 was developed by the American Petroleum Institute in collaboration with the EPA.

The EPA has developed a software program named "TANKS" which performs the Chapter 7 methodology for calculating emission losses from storage tanks.  The program's installer file along with a user manual, and the source code are available on the Internet.

Chapters 5 and 7 discussed above are illustrative of the type of information contained in the other chapters of AP 42. Many of the fugitive emission factors in Chapter 5 and the emissions calculation methodology in Chapter 7 and the TANKS program also apply to many other industrial categories besides the petroleum industry.

Other sources of emission factors
The Global Atmospheric Pollution (GAP) Forum Air Pollutant Emissions Inventory Manual, Stockholm Environment Institute, Version 1.7, October 2010 sei-international.org.
United Kingdom's emission factor database archived 2010.National Atmospheric Emissions Inventory UK
 Emission Inventory Guidebook. EMEP/European Environment Agency 2007 Guidebook, was updated 2016 
IPCC Emission factors Database 2006, IPCC Guidelines for National Greenhouse Gas Inventories Revised 1996  .
Fugitive emissions leaks from ethylene and other chemical plants harc.edu 2002.
Emissions Estimation Technique Manuals (94 types) Australian National Pollutant Inventory, 2006.
Canadian Greenhouse Gas Inventory Methodologies. 2016 Air Pollutant Emission Inventory report: annex 2 - inventory development: part 1 National Air Pollution Surveillance Program, (Canada) 2018-05-29, retrieved 2018-07-13
Sangea - Greenhouse Gas Emission Estimation Software American Petroleum Institute, 2012 by Trinity Consultants/T3.
Greenhouse Gas Emission Estimation Methodologies Mining Association Of Canada, 2000, The Pembina Institute, and Stratos Inc.
 Air Pollutant Emission Factor Library  Finnish Environment Institute, retrieved 2018-07-13. (includes info from EMEP/EEA Guidebook of 2016)

See also
Cement kiln emissions
Emission factor

References

Smog
Air pollution emissions
Air pollution in the United States
Atmospheric dispersion modeling
United States Environmental Protection Agency
1968 in the environment